António Manuel Pacheco Domingos (born 1 December 1966), known as Pacheco, is a Portuguese former footballer who played as a left winger.

Club career
Born in Portimão, Algarve, Pacheco started playing with local G.D. Torralta and Portimonense SC, making his debut in the Primeira Liga with the latter in the 1986–87 season. Subsequently, aged just 20, he signed with S.L. Benfica, going on to remain with the club for the next six years and help to the conquest of four major titles.

Pacheco contributed five goals in 26 matches in the 1988–89 campaign, as the Lisbon side won the national championship. He was also in the starting XI when they lost two European Cup finals in three years, in 1988 and 1990.

Pacheco signed with neighbouring Sporting CP in summer 1993, alongside teammate Paulo Sousa. From there onwards, however, he received little continuity due to injuries, and totalled only 50 league appearances in five years, also representing C.F. Os Belenenses, A.C. Reggiana 1919 and C.D. Santa Clara; he retired in 2001 at the age of 34, after three seasons in the lower leagues.

In 1996, Pacheco went on trial with Premier League side Sunderland, but was not offered a permanent contract. He amassed Portuguese top-division totals of 213 games and 32 goals, over one decade.

International career
Pacheco earned six caps for Portugal in two years, all as a Benfica player. His first appearance came on 15 February 1989, as he came on as a 60th-minute substitute in a 1–1 home draw against Belgium for the 1990 FIFA World Cup qualifiers.

Honours
Benfica
Primeira Liga: 1988–89, 1990–91
Taça de Portugal: 1992–93
Supertaça Cândido de Oliveira: 1989
European Cup runner-up: 1987–88, 1989–90

Sporting CP
Taça de Portugal: 1994–95

References

External links

1966 births
Living people
People from Portimão
Portuguese footballers
Association football wingers
Primeira Liga players
Liga Portugal 2 players
Segunda Divisão players
Portimonense S.C. players
S.L. Benfica footballers
Sporting CP footballers
C.F. Os Belenenses players
C.D. Santa Clara players
Atlético Clube de Portugal players
G.D. Estoril Praia players
Serie A players
A.C. Reggiana 1919 players
Portugal youth international footballers
Portugal under-21 international footballers
Portugal international footballers
Portuguese expatriate footballers
Expatriate footballers in Italy
Portuguese expatriate sportspeople in Italy
Portuguese football managers
Liga Portugal 2 managers
Portimonense S.C. managers
Atlético Clube de Portugal managers
Sportspeople from Faro District